Battalions of Fear is the debut album by German power metal band Blind Guardian, released in 1988. The album is a raw and unpolished speed metal effort that touches on thrash metal. It lacks many of the stylistic flourishes that would mark the band's music in later years, focusing more on speed and aggression. The opening track "Majesty" remains a fan favorite and is often featured in the band's live performances. This album was remastered, remixed and re-released on 15 June 2007, with the whole first demo tape, Symphonies of Doom, of the band (at the time called Lucifer's Heritage) as part of the bonus tracks. The album was again re-released as part of the A Traveler's Guide to Space and Time boxset with minor adjustments to the mixing and with new mastering.

Track listing 
All songs written by André Olbrich and Hansi Kürsch, except where noted. All lyrics written by Kürsch.

Lyrical and musical themes 

 The songs "Majesty" and "Run for the Night", as well as the titles of instrumentals "By the Gates of Moria" and "Gandalf's Rebirth", are based on J. R. R. Tolkien's The Lord of the Rings.
 Parts of "By the Gates of Moria" are derived from Antonín Dvořák's Symphony No. 9, "From the New World".
 "Majesty" opens with a barrel organ version of Johann Strauss II's waltz The Blue Danube.
 "Guardian of the Blind" is based on Stephen King's It.
 "The Martyr" is about Jesus Christ's passion.
 "Battalions of Fear" refers to US president Ronald Reagan's Strategic Defense Initiative.
 "Wizard's Crown" is about Aleister Crowley. The song was originally titled "Halloween" on the Symphonies of Doom demo tape (1985) while the band was still Lucifer's Heritage. The song name was changed probably to avoid confusion with a song of the same name by fellow German power/speed metal band Helloween.
 "Brian" is about the film Monty Python's Life of Brian.

Personnel 
Blind Guardian
 Hansi Kürsch – vocals and bass, producer on "Gandalf's Rebirth"
 André Olbrich – lead guitar and backing vocals, producer on "Gandalf's Rebirth"
 Marcus Siepen – rhythm guitar and backing vocals
 Thomas "Thomen" Stauch – drums

Guest musicians
 Hans-Peter Frey – drums on "Gandalf's Rebirth"
 Christof Theisen – rhythm guitar on "Gandalf's Rebirth"
 Rolf Köhler, Michael Voss – backing vocals

Production
 Kalle Trapp – production, engineering, mixing
 Holger Schreiber – engineering on "Gandalf's Rebirth"
 van Waay Design – cover art

Lucifer's Heritage (tracks 10–14)
 Hansi Kürsch – vocals and bass
 André Olbrich – lead guitar
 Markus Dörk – rhythm guitar, additional vocals on "Symphonies of Doom"
 Thomas "Thomen" Stauch – drums

Charts

References

1988 debut albums
Blind Guardian albums